Mark Andrew Boothman (born 6 June 1977) is an Australian Liberal National politician who is the Member of Parliament for Theodore in the Legislative Assembly of Queensland, having defeated government whip Margaret Keech to win Albert at the 2012 state election.

References

1977 births
Living people
Liberal National Party of Queensland politicians
Members of the Queensland Legislative Assembly
People from the Gold Coast, Queensland
21st-century Australian politicians